The England men's national under-18 basketball team is a national basketball team of England, administered by the Basketball England. It represents the country in men's international under-16 basketball competitions.

See also
 England national basketball team
 England women's national basketball team
 Great Britain national basketball team
 England men's national under-16 basketball team
 England national 3x3 team

References

External links
 Official website
 EuroBasket.com – England Men National Team U18/19
 England Basketball Records at FIBA Archive

Basketball in England
Men's national under-18 basketball teams
Basketball